Clematis viticaulis is a species of flowering plant in the buttercup family known by the common names Millboro leatherflower and grape clematis.

Distribution and habitat
It is endemic to the Appalachian Mountains in western Virginia, in the Eastern United States. It is known from Bath, Augusta, and Rockbridge Counties.

This plant is limited to the shale barrens habitat and woodlands along its edges. There are 18 to 20 occurrences, with a total global population of 1500 to 2500 individuals. Despite its rarity and endangered species status, the plant's population is generally stable, with only minor threats, such as herbivory and road maintenance. Recruitment from seed is uncommon but the plants live a long time once established.

Description
The thin, leathery oval leaves are up to 8 centimeters long by 4.5 wide and are oppositely arranged on the stems.

The inflorescence is a single urn-shaped flower. There are no petals, just hairy purple or blue- or green-tinged sepals which are lance-shaped and up to 2.5 centimeters long. The sepal tips are pointed or rounded and spread, curve, or curl backward.

The fruit is an achene with a plumelike, copper-colored extension up to 4 centimeters long.

See also

References

External links
USDA Plants Profile for Clematis viticaulis (Millboro leather flower)

viticaulis
Endemic flora of the United States
Flora of Virginia
Flora of the Appalachian Mountains
Augusta County, Virginia
Bath County, Virginia
Rockbridge County, Virginia
Endangered flora of the United States